Eunicella is a genus of coral in the family Gorgoniidae family.

Species
The World Register of Marine Species lists the following species:

Eunicella alba (Esper, 1766)
Eunicella albatrossi Stiasny
Eunicella albicans (Kolliker, 1865)
Eunicella cavolini (Koch, 1887)
Eunicella ctenocelloides Stiasny, 1936
Eunicella dawydoffi Stiasny, 1938
Eunicella densa Kükenthal, 1917
Eunicella dubia Studer, 1890
Eunicella filifica Grasshoff, 1992
Eunicella filiformis (Studer, 1879)
Eunicella filum Grasshoff, 1992
Eunicella furcata (Koch)
Eunicella gazella Studer, 1878
Eunicella germaini Stiasny, 1937
Eunicella gracilis Grasshoff, 1992
Eunicella granulata Grasshoff, 1992
Eunicella hendersoni Kükenthal, 1908
Eunicella kochi (Studer, 1901)

Eunicella labiata Thomson, 1927
Eunicella lata Kükenthal, 1917
Eunicella modesta Verrill, 1883
Eunicella multituberculata Stiasny, 1935
Eunicella palma (Esper)
Eunicella papillifera Edwards & Haime, 1857
Eunicella papillosa (Esper, 1797)
Eunicella pendula Kükenthal, 1908
Eunicella pergamentacea Ridley, 1882
Eunicella pillsbury Grasshoff, 1992
Eunicella pustulosa Stiasny, 1935
Eunicella racemosa (Milne-Edwards & Haime, 1857)
Eunicella rigida Kükenthal, 1908
Eunicella singularis (Esper, 1791)
Eunicella tenuis Verrill, 1869
Eunicella tricoronata Velimirov, 1971
Eunicella verrucosa (Pallas, 1766)

References 

Gorgoniidae
Taxonomy articles created by Polbot
Octocorallia genera